Lister Hospital can refer to:
 Lister Hospital, Stevenage, an NHS hospital on the outskirts of Stevenage, Herefordshire, England
 Lister Hospital, Chelsea, a private hospital in London

See also
 Lister Institute of Preventive Medicine, the precursor to the Lister Hospital, Chelsea